Taylor Nunataks are two isolated nunataks, 650 m and 660 m, joined by a narrow ridge, lying southeast of Mount Quilmes in the eastern half of Joinville Island. Surveyed by the Falkland Islands Dependencies Survey (FIDS) in 1953. Named by the United Kingdom Antarctic Place-Names Committee (UK-APC) for Robert J.F. Taylor of FIDS, dog-physiologist at Hope Bay in 1954 and 1955, who accompanied the FIDS survey party to Joinville Island in 1953–54.

Nunataks of Graham Land
Landforms of the Joinville Island group